Ectopoglossus confusus is a species of frog in the family Dendrobatidae. It is endemic to the Chagres Highlands of Panama, at 720 to 810 meters above sea level, where it can be mistaken for Colostethus panamansis, which is more common and also lives in the area. Its population is severely effected by the local presence of Batrachochytrium dendrobatidis, a type of fungus that has devastated many amphibian species worldwide.

References

Poison dart frogs
Amphibians of Panama
Endemic fauna of Panama
Amphibians described in 2012